Perceli Yato (born 17 January 1993) is a Fijian rugby union player. He plays at flanker for Clermont in the Top 14.

Career
Yato was born in Sigatoka, the home of rugby in Fiji where he attended Waicoba District School and he got his secondary education at Sigatoka Valley High School and Sigatoka Mission College. He played for Fiji at the 2013 IRB Junior World Championship after which he was picked by ASM Clermont Auvergne as an espoir. He made his Top 14 debut off the bench against Bayonne RC in January 2014. In the 2014–15 Top 14 season, he played 10 games for Clermont scoring 7 tries, 2 of which was against Stade Français who went on to win that season.

References

External links 
 

Living people
1993 births
ASM Clermont Auvergne players
Fijian expatriate sportspeople in France
Expatriate rugby union players in France
I-Taukei Fijian people
People from Sigatoka
Rugby union flankers
Fijian rugby union players
Fiji international rugby union players